Tay Bridge transmitting station is a relay transmitter of Angus, situated in Newport-on-Tay. It is owned and operated by Arqiva.

Channels listed by frequency

Analogue radio (FM VHF)

Digital radio (DAB)

Analogue television
These services were broadcast until 18 August 2010. BBC2 Scotland was previously closed on 4 August.

Digital television

External links
Tay Bridge at The Transmission Gallery

Transmitter sites in Scotland